List of members of 13th Lok Sabha (1999-2004) by state.

Andhra Pradesh 

Keys:

Arunachal Pradesh
Keys:

Assam
Keys:

 CPI(ML)L (1)

Bihar
Keys:

Goa

Gujarat
Keys:

Haryana
Keys:

Himachal Pradesh
Keys:

Jammu & Kashmir
Keys:

Karnataka
Keys:

Kerala
Keys:

Madhya Pradesh
Keys:

Maharashtra
Keys:

Manipur
Keys:

Meghalaya
Keys:

Mizoram
Keys:

Nagaland
Keys:

Orissa
Keys:

Punjab
Keys:

Rajasthan
Keys;

Sikkim
Keys;

Tamil Nadu
Keys;

Tripura
Keys;

Uttar Pradesh

West Bengal
Keys:

Union Territories

Andaman and Nicobar Islands
Keys:

Chandigarh
Keys:

Dadra and Nagar Haveli
Keys:

Daman and Diu
Keys:

NCT of Delhi
Keys:

Lakshadweep
Keys:

Puducherry
Keys:

References

13
List